Vilhelmina BK  was a sports club in Vilhelmina, Sweden. The women's soccer team played in the Swedish top division in 1981.

References

Defunct football clubs in Sweden